KFCC may refer to:

 KFCC-LP, a low-power radio station (97.9 FM) licensed to serve Mission, Texas, United States
 Korea Foundation